Daniel Donald Joseph (March 26, 1929 – May 24, 2011) was an American mechanical engineer. He was the Regents Professor Emeritus and Russell J. Penrose Professor Emeritus of Department of Aerospace Engineering and Mechanics at the University of Minnesota. He was widely known for his research in fluid dynamics.

Academic career
Joseph received his Masters in Sociology from the University of Chicago in 1950. He received his B.S. (1959), M.S. (1960), and Ph.D. (1963) degrees in Mechanical Engineering from the Illinois Institute of Technology. Joseph started his academic career as an Assistant Professor of Mechanical Engineering at Illinois Institute of Technology in 1962. In the following year he joined University of Minnesota as an Assistant Professor of Aerospace Engineering and Mechanics. He was named full Professor in 1968.

Joseph's interests included stability of fluid flow, irrotational motions of viscous and viscoelastic fluids, and direct numerical simulations of solid–liquid flows. He has been listed as an ISI Highly Cited Author in Engineering by the ISI Web of Knowledge, Thomson Scientific Company.

Honors and awards
G. I. Taylor Medal, Society of Engineering Science, 1990
Member of the National Academy of Engineering, 1990
Member of the National Academy of Sciences, 1991 
Bingham Medal of the Society of Rheology, 1993
Fellow of the American Academy of Arts and Sciences, 1993
Timoshenko Medal, 1995
Fluid Dynamics Prize, American Physical Society, 1999

Books authored
 Joseph, D. D., Stability of Fluid Motions, I and II, Springer-Verlag, New York (1976). 
 Joseph, D. D. and Y. Renardy, Fundamentals of Two-Fluid Dynamics. Part 1: Mathematical Theory and Applications, Springer-Verlag, New York (1993). 
 Joseph, D. D. and Y. Renardy, Fundamentals of Two-Fluid Dynamics: Part 2: Lubricated Transport, Drops and Miscible Liquids, Springer-Verlag, New York (1993). 
 Joseph, D. D., Elementary Stability and Bifurcation Theory, 2nd ed., Springer (1997). 
 Joseph, D. D., Fluid Dynamics of Viscoelastic Liquids, Springer (2007). 
 Joseph, D. D., Funada, T., and Wang, J., Potential Flows of Viscous and Viscoelastic Liquids, Cambridge University Press (2007).

References

1929 births
2011 deaths
American mechanical engineers
Fellows of the American Academy of Arts and Sciences
Fellows of the American Physical Society
Fluid dynamicists
Illinois Institute of Technology alumni
Members of the United States National Academy of Sciences
Members of the United States National Academy of Engineering
University of Chicago alumni
University of Minnesota faculty